Perverse Recollections of a Necromangler is the debut album by American death metal band Waking the Cadaver, released on November 21, 2007, by Necroharmonic Productions.

Background and recording 
Perverse Recollections of a Necromangler was recorded at Cape Studios located in Cape May, New Jersey, during February to April 2007. Two Robert De Niro films were sampled: Taxi Driver (1976) and A Bronx Tale (1993). According to the album's liner notes, no effects processing was used on the band's voices. The two songs "Blood Splattered Satisfaction" and "Chased Through the Woods by a Rapist" were originally included on the band's demo that was recorded and released a year prior to this album.

Reception 
The album received poor reviews and reception from critics. Daniel Cairns of Chronicles of Chaos gave the album a score of 1.5 out of 10 and stated "It's a boring buzz of crap riffs, shitty drumming and belched vocals. It's genuinely painful to listen to at times, and you yearn for something a bit more pleasant and musical."

AllMusic, when reviewing the band's following album Beyond Cops, Beyond God, stated "Anyone who heard Waking the Cadaver's first album, 2007's Perverse Recollections of a Necromangler, would find it hard to believe that any label would pick them up. They were almost laughably inept."

Track list

Personnel 
 Waking the Cadaver
 Don Campan – lead vocals
 Dennis Morgan – drums, backing vocals
 Steve Vermilyea – bass, backing vocals
 Jerry Regan – guitar
 Nick Palmateer – guitar

 Production staff
 Miguel Gomes – recording
 C.J. Thouret – production, mixing, mastering
 Steve Ryan – production, mixing, mastering
 Tony Koehl – cover art, layout

All music written and performed by Waking the Cadaver. Lyrics to tracks 2–7 and 9–11 written by drummer Denis Morgan and guitarist Steve Vermilyea. Lyrics to track 8 written by vocalist Don Campan.

References 

2007 debut albums
Waking the Cadaver albums